Softs is the ninth studio album by the jazz rock band Soft Machine, released in 1976. It is the final album to feature founding keyboardist Mike Ratledge, who appears on two tracks but left the group before the album was completed.

Overview
John Etheridge replaced Allan Holdsworth on guitar shortly after the release of the previous album, Bundles, and Alan Wakeman, cousin of keyboardist Rick Wakeman, took over saxophone duties from Karl Jenkins. Karl would play keyboards exclusively from this point onward. This change was necessitated by the departure of the group's last founding member, Mike Ratledge, who left in March 1976 before the sessions were completed, and can be heard on two tracks, but is not credited as a member of the group. Wakeman and bassist Roy Babbington left the group not long after the album was released, Wakeman having been a member for less than six months.

Track listing
All compositions by Karl Jenkins except where indicated.

Side one
"Aubade" – 1:49
"The Tale of Taliesin" – 7:15
"Ban-Ban Caliban" – 9:19
"Song of Aeolus" – 4:29

Side two
"Out of Season" – 5:30
"Second Bundle" – 2:35
"Kayoo" (John Marshall) – 3:25
"The Camden Tandem" (John Etheridge, John Marshall) – 1:50
"Nexus" – 0:47
"One Over the Eight" (Karl Jenkins, John Marshall, John Etheridge, Alan Wakeman, Roy Babbington) – 5:26
"Etika" (John Etheridge) – 2:21

Personnel
Soft Machine
Roy Babbington – bass guitar
John Etheridge – acoustic and electric guitars
John Marshall – drums, percussion
Alan Wakeman – soprano and tenor saxophones
Karl Jenkins – piano, electric piano, Hohner Pianet, Minimoog and string synthesizers, orchestrations

Additional musician
Mike Ratledge – synthesizer (3, 4)

References

External links
 Soft Machine - Softs (1976) album review by Dave Lynch, credits & releases at AllMusic
 Soft Machine - Softs (1976) album releases & credits at Discogs
 Soft Machine - Softs (1976) album credits & user reviews at ProgArchives.com
 Soft Machine - Softs (1976) album to be listened on Spotify
 Soft Machine - Softs (1976) album to be listened on YouTube
 Soft Machine discography (info about the albums) at Calyx

1976 albums
Harvest Records albums
Soft Machine albums